Next Life is an adventure game developed by Czech company Future Games and published by The Adventure Company designed for Microsoft Windows-based computers. The game engine is OGRE.

Premise
The main character Adam Reichl possibly dies in a car accident and wakes up on unknown island in the middle of nowhere. He starts to explore and tries to find out where he is, only to find that there are other people in the island seemingly from different time periods.

Reception

Next Life received mixed to negative reviews from critics. On Metacritic, the game received a score of 56/100 based on 13 reviews, indicating "mixed or average reviews".

References

External links
Official site

Adventure games
Point-and-click adventure games
Video games developed in the Czech Republic
Windows games
Windows-only games
2007 video games
The Adventure Company games

Single-player video games